There have been two baronetcies created for members of the Fleetwood family, an old Lancashire family, one in the Baronetage of England and one in the Baronetage of the United Kingdom. Both creations are extinct.

Fleetwood baronets, of Caldwick (1611)
The Fleetwood Baronetcy, of Caldwich in the County of Stafford, was created in the Baronetage of England by James I on 19 June 1611 for Richard Fleetwood, a direct descendant of William Fleetwood of Hesketh, Lancashire. He was High Sheriff of Staffordshire in 1614 and built the Grade I listed Wootton Lodge at Ellastone The title became extinct on the death of the sixth Baronet in 1780.

Sir Richard Fleetwood, 1st Baronet (died 1649)
Sir Thomas Fleetwood, 2nd Baronet (1609–1670)
Sir Richard Fleetwood, 3rd Baronet (1628–1700)
Sir Thomas Fleetwood, 4th Baronet (died 1739)
Sir John Fleetwood, 5th Baronet (died 1741)
Sir Thomas Fleetwood, 6th Baronet (1741–1780)

Hesketh-Fleetwood baronets, of Rossall Hall (1838)
The Fleetwood Baronetcy, of Rossall Hall in the County of Lancaster, was created in the Baronetage of the United Kingdom in  1838 for Peter Hesketh-Fleetwood, of Rossall Hall, a politician and landowner. He was a descendant of the youngest son of William Fleetwood of Hesketh through the female line, a grandson of Margaret Fleetwood, heiress of Rossall who married Roger Hesketh in 1733. Following his inheritance of the Rossall estate he assumed the additional surname of Fleetwood in 1831. He gave the name to the town of Fleetwood which he developed.  The title became extinct on the death of his son, the second Baronet, in 1881.

Sir Peter Hesketh-Fleetwood, 1st Baronet (1801–1866)
Sir Peter Louis Hesketh-Fleetwood, 2nd Baronet (1838–1881)

Other notable members of the Fleetwood family
 Thomas Fleetwood (1518–1570), Master of the Mint.
 Sir William Fleetwood of Cranford, Receiver of the Court of Wards.
 James Fleetwood (died 1683), Bishop of Worcester.
 Sir William Fleetwood of Missenden (died 1593), Sergeant at Law and Recorder of London.  
 Miles Fleetwood, Receiver of the Court of Wards.
 Sir William Fleetwood, Cup bearer to James I and Charles I. 
 Sir Thomas Fleetwood, Attorney General to Prince Henry, son of James I. 
 George Fleetwood (born 1623 – died circa 1672), Regicide.
 Charles Fleetwood (1618–1692), Commander in Chief to Richard Cromwell and husband of Bridget, daughter of Oliver Cromwell.
 George Fleetwood (1605–1667), was a brother of General Charles Fleetwood, became a Swedish general and baron.

See also

 Fleetwood (baronial family)
 Fleetwood (surname)
 Fleetwood coastal town

References

 

Baronetcies in the Baronetage of England
Extinct baronetcies in the Baronetage of the United Kingdom